Abu Shakar (also Romanized as Abū Shakar) is a village in Minubar Rural District, Arvandkenar District, Abadan County, Khuzestan Province, Iran. At the 2006 census, its population was 872, in 183 families.

References 

Populated places in Abadan County